The Jose Rizal-class of multi-role guided missile frigates, currently in service with the Philippine Navy, are a heavily modified variant of the ROK Navy's s. The ships, which were built by Hyundai Heavy Industries (HHI), are specifically accommodated to fit the requirements of the Philippine Navy. The frigates will improve the ability of the Philippine Navy's Offshore Combat Force, which is mostly composed of ships that were retired from other countries and subsequently transferred to the Philippines.

Development

First stage bid 

In May 2013, the Department of National Defense opened the "Frigate Acquisition Project", calling for the acquisition of two brand new frigates for the Philippine Navy with the contract price of Php 18 billion (around US$437 million as of May 2013). This is after rejecting the proposal to procure two s from Italy due to preference to acquire new ships. The tender was a two-stage bidding system, with proponents needing to pass the initial bid stage by meeting the minimum requirements set by the program, before finalizing their offers and submit for the second and final bidding.

Seven bidders participated in the first stage bid, namely Garden Reach Shipbuilders & Engineers (GRSE) of India, STX France SA, Navantia SA of Spain, Hyundai Heavy Industries (HHI) of South Korea, STX Offshore & Shipbuilding Co. Ltd. of South Korea, Daewoo Shipbuilding & Marine Engineering (DSME) of South Korea, and ThyssenKrupp Marine Systems (TKMS) of Germany. For the 1st stage bidding, only four shipbuilders were declared as qualified, with GRSE, STX France, and TKMS disqualified for failing to meet documentation requirements. A Motion for Reconsideration was provided by GRSE and STX France, which were accepted by the DND Bids and Awards Committee.

Pre-second stage bid changes 
With six proponents passing the first stage bidding phase, successive meetings were held with the Philippine Navy, wherein the DND found out restrictions in the export of munitions through third party shipbuilders. This paved the way for the split of the project into two lots by August 2014:

Lot 1, with an Approved Budget for Contract (ABC) worth Php 15.5 billion (around US$348 million as of August 2014), covering for the platform (ship hull and all working components, guns, and missile and torpedo launchers)

Lot 2, with an ABC worth Php 2.5 billion (around US$56 million) for munitions, missiles, and torpedoes.

Delays were encountered from 2014 to 2015 due to funding issues, with then Pres. Benigno Aquino III gave the DND the authority to enter into multi-year contracts (MYC), while also approving the remainder of the project list submitted in 2013 by the Armed Forces of the Philippines under its AFP Modernization Program Horizon 1 Phase (2013-2017), which includes the Frigate Acquisition Project.

Second stage bidding 
A new Supplemental Bid Bulletin for the project's Lot 1 second-stage bidding was released by the DND in February 2016, with an updated technical specifications provided for the proponents to follow and the schedule for the Submission of Bids and Opening of Envelopes (SOBE). The updated specifications were understood to be more detailed, and included improved features over the initial technical specifications provided during the first stage bidding. The ABC was also increased to Php 16 billion (around US$355 million) to cover for the peso's declining value over the US dollar, and to allow the improvements of the ships' key features.

Of the six proponents that passed the first stage bidding phase on 17 March 2016, only four submitted their bids for the second stage bidding phase: South Korea's HHI and DSME, Spain's Navantia SA, and India's GRSE. STX Offshore & Shipbuilding Co.'s bid submission was rejected after submitting beyond the deadline, while STX France SA did not submit a bid.

Of the four bids, only the bids of GRSE and HHI were deemed compliant, while DSME and Navantia's bids were disqualified for failing to meet documentation requirements. No Motion for Reconsideration were submitted by the two disqualified shipbuilders. Also, the DND Bids and Awards Committee confirmed GRSE, which offered a platform based on their Kamorta-class large ASW corvette design with a bid value of Php 15.047 billion, as the lowest bidder. HHI, which offered their HDF-3000-based frigate design with a bid value of Php 15.744 billion, was named as the second lowest bidder.

Post-bid qualification and contract awarding 
As part of the procurement process, the lowest bidder will undergo a post-qualification inspection wherein members of the bids and awards committee and the project management team will conduct inspections at the proponent's office and shipbuilders, and confirm the submissions provided including their account books.

The joint DND-PN team conducted the post-bid qualification inspection of GRSE in June 2016, wherein they found that it did not meet financial requirements, specifically the Net Financial Contracting Capacity (NFCC), which gave the DND-PN team a reason to conduct a post-bid qualification inspection with the second lowest bidder, HHI. This was done and completed in July 2016, wherein the team found that HHI was able to comply with the requirements and was considered the Lowest Post-Qualified Bidder while declaring GRSE as Post-Disqualified.

A Notice of Award with the amount of Php 15,744,571,584.00 (around US$336.912 million) was released by the DND and awarded to HHI in August 2016, which initiated contract negotiations between the DND-PN and with HHI from September to October 2016.

On 24 October 2016, the contract to supply two brand new general purpose stealth frigates was signed between the Department of National Defense, represented by Defense Sec. Delfin Lorenzana, and Hyundai Heavy Industries, represented by its Senior Vice President Mr. Ki Sun Chung, under the presence of officials from the DND, AFP, PN, HHI, and the South Korean Ambassador to the Philippines. On the same day, HHI released a computer generated image of the frigate in their website, and released information about the dimensions of the ships.

On 30 April 2018, the HHI officially started the process for construction of the first frigate according to Navy spokesperson, Capt. Lued Lincuna. Lincuna said TIAC's acceptance of the CDR marks a significant step forward and a milestone for the project, which consists of the approval of 71 critical detailed design drawings as submitted by HHI. On 16 September 2018, HHI had started the steel cutting of the second frigate before the start of keel laying of the first frigate.

Sensors and weapon systems 
Based on HHI's offer on the Bill of Quantities (BOQ) Materials List on the Submission of Bids and Envelopes (SOBE) during the 2nd Stage Bidding, there were two options provided for most sensors and weapon systems. Out of the options, the Philippine Navy's Technical Working Group for the project chose the following:

Thales TACTICOS Baseline 2 Combat Management System (CMS)
 Thales NS-106 Active Electronically Scanned Array S-band Radar
 Thales TS82521 Identification Friend or Foe (IFF) System
 Thales STIR Mk 1.2 Fire Control Radar
 Thales Bluewatcher Hull Mounted Sonar
 Thales Link Y Mk 2 Tactical Data Link
 Thales Vigile LW Electronic Support Measure (ESM), upgraded to Thales Vigile 100
 Terma C-Guard countermeasures system
 Safran Paseo NS Electro-Optical Tracking System (EOTS)
 MSI DS30 mm RCWS as secondary weapon
 L3 MAPPS Integrated Platform Management System

But after securing the contract, the sensors and weapon systems later then changed to a different configuration, using the following:
 Hanwha Systems Naval Shield Baseline 2 Integrated CMS
 Hensoldt TRS-3D Baseline D multi-mode phased array C-band Radar
 Hensoldt MSSR 2000I Identification Friend or Foe (IFF) System
 Leonardo Selex ES NA-25X Fire Control Radar
 Harris Corporation Model 997 medium frequency active/passive ASW hull mounted sonar
 Hanwha Systems Link P Tactical Data Link (derived from Link K)
 Elbit Systems Elisra NS9300A Electronic Support Measure (ESM)
 Terma C-Guard countermeasure system (retained)
 Safran PASEO NS Electro-Optical Tracking System (EOTS)(retained)
 Aselsan SMASH 30mm RCWS as secondary weapon
 Servowatch Integrated Platform Management System

Aside from the options, Hyundai and the Philippine Navy agreed to use the following weapon systems based on the specifications provided by the DND, the frigates will be armed and have provisions for the following:
 a primary 76 mm gun with 120 rounds/minute capability; Oto Melara Super Rapid 76 mm main gun.
 a secondary gun between 30 40 mm caliber, on a remote stabilized mount; Aselsan SMASH 30 mm RCWS as secondary weapon
 at least four anti-ship missile systems with a minimum range of 150 kilometers and a minimum speed of Mach 0.8; LIGNex1 SSM-700K C-Star anti-ship surface-to-surface missiles.
 two twin launchers for anti-aircraft missiles, with a minimum range of 6 kilometers, with IR or semi-active homing seeker; MBDA Mistral missiles on MBDA Simbad-RC VSHORAD launchers
 two triple trainable lightweight torpedo launchers with torpedoes, with a minimum range of 2,000 meters, with active, passive, or mixed homing guidance and an operating depth between 10 and 600 meters deep; J+S/SEA Ltd. TLS-TT Shipboard Torpedo Launching System; LIGNex1 K745 Blue Shark torpedoes
 four heavy machine guns; S&T Motiv 12.7 mm K6 Heavy Machine Guns
 for a Close-in weapon system (CIWS) (FFBNW)
 for an 8-cell Vertical Launch System (VLS) (FFBNW)
 for a Towed Array Sonar System (TASS) (FFBNW)

Construction

BRP Jose Rizal timeline

On May 1, 2018, the steel cutting ceremony was held for P159 (project number of first of two frigates) at HHI shipyard in Ulsan, South Korea, marking the first step of the ship's construction journey.

On October 16, 2018, HHI held the keel laying ceremony for P159 at HHI shipyard, marking the formal start of the construction of the ship.

On December 20, 2018, Lorenzana announced at a press conference the names of the two future frigates being built by HHI: BRP Jose Rizal and BRP Antonio Luna.

On May 23, 2019, HHI launched the first ship, the prospective BRP Jose Rizal, at HHI shipyard. In the press briefing the same day, a Hanwha official said that Link 16 will likely not be compatible for the frigates until 2020 because of issues between US and South Korea.

From November 2019 to February 2020, HHI held six sea trials. All of which the Technical Inspection and Acceptance Committee reported “generally satisfactory” results.

While en route home, the ship transported 20,000 protective masks, 180 barrels of disinfectant solution, 2,000 bottles of hand sanitizer, and 300 packs of disinfectant wipes donated from the South Korean government to aid the Philippines against the COVID-19 pandemic. The donation is said to be part of South Korea's campaign to assist countries that have aided South Korea during the Korean War. On May 23, 2020, the ship arrived in Subic Bay in the Philippines after a five-day sail from South Korea.

The commissioning was delayed after one of the ship's 65-crew tested positive for COVID-19 amidst the pandemic. On July 10, 2020, the ship was eventually commissioned into service making the name BRP Jose Rizal (FF-150) official.

BRP Antonio Luna timeline

On September 17, 2018, the steel cutting ceremony was held for P160 (project number of second of two frigates) at HHI shipyard at the Shin Hwa Tech facility in Pohang City, South Korea, marking the first step of the ship's construction journey.

On May 23, 2019, HHI held the keel laying ceremony for P160 at HHI shipyard, marking the formal start of the construction of the ship.

On November 8, 2019, HHI launched the second ship, the prospective BRP Antonio Luna, at Ulsan shipyard in South Korea.

The ship's outfitting, sea trials and delivery were affected by restrictions due to the COVID-19 pandemic. HHI conducted sea trials to test the ship's seaworthiness, propulsion, communications, weapons and sensor systems.

On December 18, 2020, the Technical Inspection and Acceptance Committee declared that the ship is compliant with the agreed technical specifications after witnessing its performance during the sea trials.

On February 9, 2021, the ship was met by BRP Jose Rizal and three FA-50 jets in the vicinity of Capones Island, Zambales having departed South Korea four days prior.

On March 19, 2021, the BRP Antonio Luna officially entered service with the Philippine Navy. The ceremony happened at 8 o`clock in the morning at Pier 13, South Harbor, Manila. It was attended by Philippine Defense Secretary Delfin Lorenzana, South Korean ambassador to the Philippines Han Dong-Man and Philippine Navy chief Vice Admiral Giovanni Bacordo.

Controversy 
Issues arose over the decision made by HHI without approval by the Philippine Navy to use the Alternative Configuration in the selection of systems to be installed. Of particular concern were the radar and combat management system which were downgraded versions of the systems originally proposed. It was later revealed that the Contract was later changed to allow HHI final say over what equipment was installed on the vessels. No information is available on who authorized the change.

In January 2017, Special Assistant to the President Sec. Bong Go gave Defense Sec. Delfin Lorenzana a white paper endorsing Hanwha Systems which favours their Naval Shield Combat Management System (CMS) to be installed in the warships. Sec. Go's office also asked then Frigate Project Technical Working Group chairman Commodore Robert Empedrad, to attend a meeting in Malacañang to discuss the selection of the CMS. Empedrad would later submit a written report addressed to Pres. Duterte and Sec. Go.

Sec. Go issued a blanket denial when reached for comment, saying he never intervened in the project despite a copy/photo of the white paper being leaked online. He said he did not give Sec. Lorenzana any white paper related to the project nor asked Commodore Empedrad to brief him on the CMS selection.

The DND announced that it is welcoming any investigation on the project, noting that it has nothing to hide regarding the matter. DND public affairs office chief Arsenio Andolong made the statement in response to plans of the Senate minority bloc to conduct an investigation on the Frigate Acquisition Project (FAP).

Another issue was on the question of HHI's qualification to build the frigates, as HHI was banned from participating in any South Korean tenders for two years. A case stemmed in 2013, after its top executive was found guilty of offering bribes in order to win the bid to supply parts for four nuclear reactors to be constructed at the United Arab Emirates. In 2015, HHI was convicted and was penalized by a two-year ban. It sought to have the ban nullified in 2015, but the South Korean Supreme Court ruled with finality against the shipbuilder on December 22, 2017.

The commander of the Philippine Navy, Vice Adm. Ronald Mercado was removed from his position for "insubordination" after Defense Sec. Delfin Lorenzana declared that he jeopardized the acquisition project.

Mercado was unceremoniously replaced by Rear Adm. Robert Empedrad over the controversial P18-billion frigate acquisition project with South Korea's shipbuilder Hyundai Heavy Industries.

Ships in class

References 

Frigate classes
Frigates of the Philippine Navy